William Charles Risley (born May 29, 1967), is a former professional pitcher in Major League Baseball from – with the Montreal Expos, Seattle Mariners and Toronto Blue Jays.

Career
Risley graduated from Marist High School in Chicago and attended Truman College before being drafted by the Cincinnati Reds in 1987.  He was traded to Montreal in 1991.

He would be a relief pitcher throughout his MLB career.  Yet in the second game of a doubleheader at Dodger Stadium on July 8, 1992, Risley's big-league debut turned out to also be his only time as a starter.

Pressed into duty by manager Felipe Alou when the Expos needed to play two doubleheaders against the Los Angeles Dodgers in three days, Risley was the winning pitcher, going five innings and allowing the Dodgers just four hits, with relievers Bill Sampen and Mel Rojas closing out a 4-1 victory.

That game turned out to be Risley's only appearance with Montreal during the 1992 season, and he was used just twice out of the bullpen in 1993, pitching in 41 games in the minors, before Montreal placed him on waivers.  Risley was claimed by Seattle, where he became a reliable middle reliever on the Mariners' staff.

A career highlight came in 1995, when Risley pitched in the first four games of the American League division playoffs against the New York Yankees, earning a save in Game 4.  Ace starter Randy Johnson's three innings of relief in an 11-inning victory in Game 5 sent Seattle on to the 1995 American League Championship Series, where Risley saw action again against the Cleveland Indians.

Risley was traded that December to the Toronto Blue Jays, where he spent the last three seasons of his career.

References

External links

1967 births
Living people
American expatriate baseball players in Canada
Baseball players from Chicago
Calgary Cannons players
Cedar Rapids Reds players
Chattanooga Lookouts players
Dunedin Blue Jays players
Greensboro Hornets players
Gulf Coast Reds players
Indianapolis Indians players
Major League Baseball pitchers
Montreal Expos players
Nashville Sounds players
Ottawa Lynx players
Seattle Mariners players
St. Catharines Stompers players
Syracuse Chiefs players
Syracuse SkyChiefs players
Tacoma Rainiers players
Toronto Blue Jays players